λ Telescopii, Latinized as Lambda Telescopii, is a solitary, white-hued star in the southern constellation of Telescopium. It is visible to the naked eye as a faint point of light with an apparent magnitude of +4.87. This body is located approximately 610 light years from the Sun based on parallax. At that distance, the visual magnitude of the star is diminished by an extinction of 0.18 due to interstellar dust.

This is a late B- or early A-type main-sequence star that is generating energy through core hydrogen fusion. The star is 268 million years old with a relatively high rate of spin, showing a projected rotational velocity of 110. It has a higher than solar metallicity – the abundance of elements more massive than Helium. The star is radiating 350 times the Sun's luminosity from its photosphere at an effective temperature of 10,139 K.

References

B-type main-sequence stars
A-type main-sequence stars
Telescopii, Lambda
Telescopium (constellation)
Durchmusterung objects
175510
093148
7314